Funland (Rehoboth Beach) is a small family owned amusement park in Rehoboth Beach, Delaware. It has 19 rides as well as family style games, and an arcade. It is located right off the Rehoboth Beach boardwalk. The park opened in 1939 as the Rehoboth Beach Sports Center. It was then purchased by the Faschnacht family in 1962, and was rebranded Funland. Today, it is still owned and operated by the Faschnacht family. Funland operates rides that opened with the park, the oldest being the Boats and the Fire Engines, both of which likely opened in 1946 or 1947. Funland was affected by the COVID-19 pandemic and faced staffing shortages.

History 
Before becoming Funland in 1962, the park was known as The Rehoboth Beach Sports Center and owned by the Dentino family. On March 6, 1962, just nine days before the purchase was supposed to close, the Ash Wednesday Storm of 1962 started destroying Rehoboth Beach. The storm went on for three days before it finally subsided. By the time it finally left, The Rehoboth Beach Sports Center was one of the business left standing. It was still heavily damaged, but the Faschnacht family decided they wanted to continue with the purchase after adjusting the price for the damages. Now, Funland gets between 250,000 and 350,000 visitors each season.

Funland is normally open on weekends from Mother's Day weekend (the second Sunday in May), through the weekend after Labor Day (the first Monday in September). However, in 2020, due to the COVID-19 pandemic, it did not open until July 10.

References 

Buildings and structures in Sussex County, Delaware
1962 establishments in Delaware
Amusement arcades
Rehoboth Beach, Delaware
Tourist attractions in Sussex County, Delaware
Amusement parks opened in 1962